Alexogloblinia is a genus of flies in the family Tachinidae.

Species
Alexogloblinia shannoni (Aldrich, 1934)

Distribution
Argentina.

References

Diptera of South America
Dexiinae
Tachinidae genera
Monotypic Brachycera genera
Endemic fauna of Argentina